"Squares And Triangles" is the debut single released by Thompson Twins. It was written when the band was a four-piece consisting of Tom Bailey, Pete Dodd, John Roog, and Chris Bell. The single was originally released in three different colored sleeves (red/yellow, red/green, red/white). In 1982, the single was re-released in a black/white sleeve as a free EP along with the album Set  featuring "Weather Station", a track composed by Tom Bailey for an independent film called 'The Onlooker' (1982) and "Modern Plumbing". "Modern Plumbing" was a song recorded in late 1979 by The Blankets, a project including Tom Bailey, John Hade, and Traci. The track was used as the intro tape to the live shows for the first year or two of performing in London.

Track listing 
7" single
A. "Squares and Triangles" - 3:24
B. "Could Be Her, Could Be You" - 3:36

7" single (re-release 1982 as free single with Set)
A. "Squares and Triangles" - 3:24
B1. "Weather Station" (Tom Bailey) – 1:09
B2. "Modern Plumbing" (The Blankets) – 5:48

Personnel 
Recorded and Produced at Point Studios
Produced by Alan O'Duffy, Alex Burak, and Thompson Twins
Lyrics by P. Dodd
Music by Thompson Twins

References 

1980 debut singles
Thompson Twins songs
Songs written by Tom Bailey (musician)
1980 songs